John Dyer is a former Welsh cyclist from the Rhondda, Wales. He represented Wales at the 1966 Commonwealth Games in Kingston, Jamaica, riding the Scratch Race, Kilo and Sprint events.

Palmarès

16th Kilo, Commonwealth Games

References

Year of birth missing (living people)
Living people
Welsh male cyclists
Cyclists at the 1966 British Empire and Commonwealth Games
Commonwealth Games competitors for Wales
People from Rhondda